Bùi Viện (裴援, 1839–1878) was a prominent Vietnamese reformer and diplomat of the late 19th century, served under the Nguyễn dynasty. He was considered the first person from Vietnam to travel to the United States.

Historical background 
Bùi Viện was born into an educated, but poor, family in Thái Bình Province in the Red River Delta. As a boy, he lived among fisherman and merchants, learning whatever he could from them. The knowledge he acquired at a young age proved to be quite impactful as it eventually led to an impressive career in the fine arts.

1839 births
1878 deaths
Nguyen dynasty